Heaven and Earth may refer to:

Film 
 Heaven and Earth (1990 film), a Japanese samurai film
 Heaven & Earth (1993 film), directed by Oliver Stone, based on the memoir When Heaven and Earth Changed Places
 Heaven & Earth (soundtrack), the official musical score for the film composed by Japanese composer Kitarō
 Heaven and Earth, an upcoming film directed by Marleen Gorris

Music 
 "Heaven and Earth", a song on the 1989 Kylie Minogue album Enjoy Yourself
 Heaven and Earth (Al Jarreau album), 1992
 "Heaven and Earth", a song from the album which won the 1993 Grammy Award for Best Male R&B Vocal Performance
 Heaven and Earth, a 1999 album by Stuart Smith (musician)
 Heaven and Earth (ProjeKct X album), 2000
 Heaven & Earth (Phil Wickham album), 2009
 "Heaven & Earth" (song), the title song from the above album
 Heaven and Earth, a 2010 album by Nathan Haines
 Heaven and Earth (John Martyn album), a 2011 album by John Martyn
 Heaven & Earth (Yes album) (2014)
 List of Yes concert tours (2000s–10s)#Heaven & Earth Tour 2014–2015
 Heaven and Earth (Kamasi Washington album), 2018
 Heaven & Earth (King Crimson box set), 2019

Television 
 The Heaven and Earth Show, a BBC series running from 1998 to 2007
 Heaven and Earth, a 1957 ITV "Play of the Week" scripted and directed by Peter Brook
 Heaven & Earth, a 2007 South Korean television series

Fiction 
 Samurai: Heaven and Earth, a 2005 comic book
 Heaven and Earth, an 1821 drama by Lord Byron

Non-fiction
 When Heaven and Earth Changed Places, by Le Ly Hayslip
 Heaven and Earth (book), a popular science book by Ian Plimer

Other uses 
 Heaven & Earth (video game), a 1992 video game
 Heaven and Earth (天と地と), a free skate program by Japanese figure skater Yuzuru Hanyu
 Tenjho Tenge (English: Heaven and Earth), a  Japanese manga series and anime
 Tiandihui or Heaven and Earth Society, Chinese secret society
 Holy Marriage Blessing Ceremony of the Parents of Heaven and Earth, a 2003 special Blessing ceremony of the Unification Church
 Yin and yang, an ancient Chinese philosophy concept
 Heaven and Earth, a brand of ice teas from Coca-Cola sold in South East Asia
 Himmel und Erde (English: Heaven and Earth), a traditional German dish